The 1994 Limerick Senior Hurling Championship was the 100th staging of the Limerick Senior Hurling Championship since its establishment by the Limerick County Board.

Patrickswell were the defending champions.

On 23 October 1994, Kilmallock won the championship after a 1-12 to 0-12 defeat of Bruree in a final replay. It was their eighth championship title overall and their first title in two championship seasons.

Results

Final

References

Limerick Senior Hurling Championship
Limerick Senior Hurling Championship